Iva Straková (born 4 August 1980) is a Czech athlete who specialises in the high jump.

She has represented Czech Republic at two Summer Olympics (2004, 2008). At Beijing 2008 Straková achieved 12th place at the final. She has won Czech Championships several times. Has participated in several World and European Championships.

She has personal bests of 1.95 metres outdoors (2007, 2008) and 1.98 metres indoors (2008).

Competition record

References

External links 
 
 

1980 births
Living people
Czech female high jumpers
Olympic athletes of the Czech Republic
Athletes (track and field) at the 2004 Summer Olympics
Athletes (track and field) at the 2008 Summer Olympics
People from Tábor
Sportspeople from the South Bohemian Region